Olof Jacobsen (24 March 1888 - 2 March 1969) was a Norwegian gymnast who competed in the 1912 Summer Olympics. He was part of the Norwegian gymnastics team, which won the bronze medal in the gymnastics men's team, Swedish system event.

References

External links
profile

1888 births
1969 deaths
Norwegian male artistic gymnasts
Gymnasts at the 1912 Summer Olympics
Olympic gymnasts of Norway
Olympic bronze medalists for Norway
Olympic medalists in gymnastics
Medalists at the 1912 Summer Olympics
20th-century Norwegian people